Piotr Świderski (born 11 May 1983 in Rawicz, Poland)   is a Polish speedway rider.

Career history 
Świderski rode for the Peterborough Panthers in 2006 and 2007 before being loaned out to Ipswich for 2008. After being dropped by Ipswich he went on to ride for Lakeside Hammers in the British Elite League. In 2015 he signed for Leicester Lions to replace the retired Lewis Bridger.

References 

1983 births
Living people
Polish speedway riders
Ipswich Witches riders
Peterborough Panthers riders
People from Rawicz
Sportspeople from Greater Poland Voivodeship